Olympia London, sometimes referred to as the Olympia Exhibition Centre, is an exhibition centre, event space and conference centre in West Kensington, in the London Borough of Hammersmith and Fulham, London, England. A range of international trade and consumer exhibitions, conferences and sporting events are staged at the venue.

There is an adjacent railway station at Kensington (Olympia) which is both a London Overground station, and a London Underground station. The direct District Line spur to the station only runs on weekends.

Background 
The complex first opened in 1886.

The Grand Hall and Pillar Hall were completed in 1885. The National Hall annexe was completed in 1923, and in 1930 the Empire Hall was added.

After World War II, the West London exhibition hall was in single ownership with the larger nearby Earls Court Exhibition Centre. The latter was built in the 1930s as a rival to Olympia.

In 2008, ownership of the two venues passed from P&O to Capco Plc which sold it off as a going concern, while Earls Court was being demolished in 2014 as part of an ambitious regeneration scheme to create more luxury housing.
In 2012, Olympia celebrated 125 years of events by commissioning British artists Peter Blake, Rob Ryan, Sanna Annukka and Paul Hicks to create their interpretations of the venues.

In January 2013, a £40 million investment was completed and the company re-launched with a new brand; subsequently the business was awarded the Best Marketing Campaign at the Exhibition News Awards 2014.

 BBC Good Food Show 
 Olympia London International Horse Show
 London Chess Classic
 Pure London 
 Spirit of Christmas 
 International Art & Antiques Fair
 Marketing Week Live 
 Great British Beer Festival 
 Salon du Chocolat
 UCAS Design Your Future 
 National Wedding Show 
 Toy Fair

In May 2021, demolition work started at the site as part of a significant overhaul of the complex, which includes new construction and refurbishment of listed historic aspects.

History 

Olympia was originally conceived in the early 1880s as the National Agricultural Hall, a larger version of the Royal Agricultural Hall  (1861–62, Grade II) in Islington. The project of building a National Agricultural Hall was conceived by Edwyn Sherard Burnaby (1830-1883), MP for Leicestershire North, who primarily wanted to see shows such as the military Royal Tournament, held at the Royal Agricultural Hall in Islington since 1880, staged on a much larger scale and made more easily accessible by railway from across London and the rest of the country.

The site chosen was a former market garden in West Kensington, immediately adjacent to Addison Road station, already a major passenger station on the West London Railway, which became an important method of transport for visitors to Olympia. The building was branded as Olympia even before it opened as its commercial rationale quickly evolved beyond the staging of agricultural or military shows into an open-ended exploitation of what was the largest such venue in England at the time. Intended as a large indoor space for exhibitions, tournaments, sporting competitions and entertainments of various kinds, the building followed in the tradition of large-scale exhibition halls popularised by the Great Exhibition in 1851, the inspiration for various imitators in London, elsewhere in the United Kingdom, and around the world.

Buildings 

The Olympia Exhibition Centre consists of:

The Grand Hall, the former National Agricultural Hall.

The Pillar Hall, the former Minor Hall, both of 1885 in Italianate style by Henry Edward Coe with James Edmeston and engineers Arthur T Walmisley and Max Am Ende. The ironwork of the roof is by Handyside of Derby.

Olympia National (the former National Hall), an annexe of 1923 by architects Holman and Goodrham.

Olympia Central (built as the Empire Hall) of 1929, by architect Joseph Emberton. Olympia Central, with its large Olympia signage integral to the building's exterior, is very well known as it fronts onto a public road, Hammersmith Road. The others buildings are primarily accessed via a small access road which also serves Olympia Tube Station.

In 2003, The Grand Hall and the Pillar Hall of 1885, designed by Coe and Edmeston, were given historic status, listed at Grade II* for their historic interest and their architectural value. Olympia Central, a large concrete building in the Moderne architectural style was not fully listed due to the number of changes made through the 20th Century, however its distinctive façade was listed.

In May 2021, demolition started on the non-listed parts of Olympia London as part of a comprehensive mix-used redevelopment of the complex by its current owners, while still retaining significant exhibition space. In May 2021, the Olympia Theatre was announced with 1,575 seats, making it the largest new theatre in London since the completion of the National Theatre in 1976. This is in addition to previously announced and consented hotels, rehearsal spaces, cinemas, 4,000 seat music venue, retail, dining and public spaces. The major 21st Century redevelopment of Olympia is within the same site boundaries as the historic event spaces.

Notable events

 The International Motor Exhibition was held annually at Olympia from 1905 to 1936
 The 1st World Scout Jamboree was held at Olympia from 30 July to 8 August 1920
 Jimi Hendrix Experience on 22 December 1967
 Status Quo played on 31 December 1975 
 Procol Harum played on 1 January 1976 
 Bad Company played on 2 and 3 January 1977 
 Rod Stewart performed on 14 and 15 January 1977 
 Eubank v Stretch at the WBO Middleweight title battle, 18 April 1991
 The Cure performed on the 26th,27th,28th,30 November 1992
 Smash Hits Awards held at Olympia London on 6 December 1992 
 Eubank v Holmes at WBO super middleweight class, 20 February 1993 
 Fairuz played on 11 and 12 March 1994  
 Eubank v Jose Carlos Amaral at the WBO Super-middleweight Championship, 9 July 1994
 Spencer Oliver v Serge Poilblanc at WBO fight, 12 July 1997
 ATP tennis held from 3–6 December 1998
 3rd Mind Sports Olympiad held 21–30 August 1999
 Miss World 49th Pageant held on 4 December 1999 
 Naseem Hamed v Vuyani Bungu at WBO featherweight title battle, 11 March 2000 
 MOVE IT annual dance event, first held 2005
 Chemical Brothers played on 30 August 2008 
 Vivienne Westwood hosted a catwalk show for London Fashion Week in Olympia London, 21 February 2009 
 Bloc Party played at Olympia London on 11 and 12 May 2009 
 Gavin Rees v Colin Lynes at Prizefighter light-Welterweight battle, 2 December 2009 
 Primal Scream performed on 26 and 27 November 2010 
 Got to Dance aired from Olympia London on 29 January 2011 
 Darren Barker v Domenico Spada in the WBO European Middleweight title, 30 April 2011 
 Doctor Who Experience was held from 1 January to 22 February 2012 
 Got to Dance final aired live in March 2012 and 2013
Hatsune Miku Expo 2018 Europe, the first Hatsune Miku concert in the UK, 8 December 2018
 Olympia Beauty is an annual beauty event which first was held at Olympia in 2004
RuPaul's DragCon UK, an expo of drag culture was held in January 2020. It was called a "disaster" and a "shambles" by fans after hundreds of ticket holders were left to queue outside for hours.
Foals played on 29, April 30 April, 1 May and 2 May 2022 as part of their Life Is Yours Tour

Religious gatherings
Olympia Hall was the venue for the Aga Khan's UK Padhramni from 1–7 September 1979. Olympia Hall was transformed to a solemn place of prayer clad in red and green textile and the Imamat crest adorned with fresh flowers.

Olympia Hall was the venue for the Aga Khan's silver jubilee visit to UK on 5 July 1983. The darbar was attended by members of the Imamat family.

Political gatherings
 A mass meeting of Sir Oswald Mosley's British Union of Fascists was held at Olympia on 7 June 1934 which resulted in clashes with their Socialist and Communist opponents and much press comment.
 A European Parliament election rally of Nigel Farage's Brexit Party was held at Olympia on 21 May 2019 despite the owner's objection to their policies.

References

External links

 Official website

Buildings and structures in the London Borough of Hammersmith and Fulham
Exhibition and conference centres in London
Art Deco architecture in London
West Kensington